Michael Nehls (born October 20, 1962) is a German doctor of medicine, author, and former cyclist. From 1983 until 1989 he studied medicine at the universities of Freiburg and Heidelberg. In 1997, he achieved his postdoctoral lecture qualification in molecular genetics. Nehls authored over 50 scientific publications, two of which were published with the Nobel Prize winners Paul Greengard and Martin Evans. In 2015, his work was honored by the American American Association of Immunologists as a "pillar of immunologic research" for leading investigators in the discovery of a key molecular switch required for the development of the adaptive immune system.

Career

In 2001, after a carrier in scientific research and upper management, the former marathon runner decided - after 20 years of a sedentary lifestyle - to reconvene with serious sport.

In 2008, after having successfully competed in several long-distance cycling events, he finished the Race Across America in 10 days, 22 hours and 56 minutes to cover a distance of 3.000 miles between Oceanside, California, and Annapolis, Maryland. Out of 27 solo-participants he finished in seventh position. Nehls devised a new regenerative strategy and rested a total of 91 hours, several times more than his competitors.

He wrote a book about his experience called "Herausforderung Race Across America" (Challenge Race Across America) and produced a DVD called "You need no victory to be a winner".

Since 2011, Nehls has published several books on the necessary behavioral changes required for healthy aging from an evolutionary history point of view. First "The Methuselah-Strategy" then with "The Alzheimer's Lie" and "Alzheimer's can be cured" two books about Alzheimer's disease, in which he presents his theory about the development of this special form of dementia from evolutionary history of life and systems biology point of view.

This was also internationally published under the title "Unified theory of Alzheimer's disease (UTAD): implications for prevention and curative therapy." His breakthrough discovery regarding the development, preventiond and therapy of Alzheimer's disease, he received the Hanse-Award for Psychiatry 2015 from the University of Rostock, Germany.

Books 
 Studien zur Phylogenese cardialer Hormone bei Vertebraten und Evertebraten. Uni Heidelberg, Dissertation 1989.
 Molekulargenetische Mechanismen der Thymusentwicklung. med. Hochschule Hannover, Habilitationsschrift 1996.
 Herausforderung Race Across America: 4800 km Zeitfahren von Küste zu Küste. Delius Klasing, 2008, .
 Die Methusalem-Strategie. Vermeiden, was uns daran hindert, gesund älter und weiser zu werden. Mental Enterprises, 2011, .
 Herausforderung Race Across America: 4800 km Zeitfahren von Küste zu Küste. Überarbeitet und aktualisiert und mit neuem Bildmaterial, Mental Enterprises, 2012, 
 Die Alzheimer-Lüge: Die Wahrheit über eine vermeidbare Krankheit. Heyne, 2014, 
 Alzheimer ist heilbar. Rechtzeitig zurück in ein gesundes Leben. Heyne, 2015, .
 Demenz vorbeugen. Mediterran essen. Fona, 2017, 
 Kopfküche. Das Anti-Alzheimer-Kochbuch. Systemed, 2017, 
 Die Formel gegen Alzheimer. Die Gebrauchsanweisung für ein gesundes Leben - Ganz einfach vorbeugen und rechtzeitig heilen. Heyne, 2018, 
 Algenöl. Die Ernährungsrevolution aus dem Meer. Heyne, 2018, 
 Das Corona Syndrom. Wie das Virus unsere Schwächen offenlegt – und wie wir uns nachhaltig schützen können. Heyne, 2021, .
 Das erschöpfte Gehirn. Der Ursprung unserer mentalen Energie – und warum sie schwindet Willenskraft, Kreativität und Fokus zurückgewinnen. Heyne, 2022, .
 Herdengesundheit: Der Weg aus der Corona-Krise und die natürliche Alternative zum globalen Impfprogramm. Mental Enterprises, 2022, .

DVDs 
 Du musst nicht siegen, um zu gewinnen. 2010, .
 Gipfel der Freiheit – Herausforderung Kilimanjaro. 2011, .

References

External links 
 https://web.archive.org/web/20091212122130/http://www.michael-nehls.de/en/ – Nehls's website (in English)
 http://www.dailypeloton.com/displayarticle.asp?pk=14953 – Article about RAAM 2008.
 

German male cyclists
1962 births
Living people
German male writers
Sportspeople from Freiburg im Breisgau
20th-century German physicians
21st-century German physicians